Empire Albany was a 306-ton Coaster which was built in 1944. She was renamed Albany in 1946 and disappeared on a voyage between Port Talbot and Rosslare in 1946.

History
Empire Albany was built by Richards Ironworks Ltd, Lowestoft as yard number 337. She was launched on 3 October 1944 and completed in December 1944. Empire Airman was owned by the Ministry of War Transport and operated under the management of the J Fisher & Sons Ltd.

In 1946, Empire Albany was sold to Mrs P Dowds, Ireland and renamed Albany. On 20 November 1946, Albany departed Port Talbot bound for Rosslare, but did not arrive. Albany was carrying a cargo of coal. Two ship's boats and the name board from Albany were washed up near St David's Head on 22 November.

Official number and code letters
Official numbers were a forerunner to IMO Numbers.

Empire Airman had the Official Number 166695 on Lloyd's Register and used the Code Letters MPBM

References

1944 ships
Ships built in Lowestoft
Ministry of War Transport ships
Empire ships
Merchant ships of the Republic of Ireland
Maritime incidents in 1946
Missing ships
Shipwrecks of Wales
Ships lost with all hands